Siratus vokesorum is a species of sea snail, a marine gastropod mollusk in the family Muricidae, the murex snails or rock snails.

Description
The height of the shell attains 32 mm.

Distribution
This species occurs in the Atlantic Ocean off the Bahamas at depths between 46 m and 273 m.

References

 Merle D., Garrigues B. & Pointier J.-P. (2011) Fossil and Recent Muricidae of the world. Part Muricinae. Hackenheim: Conchbooks. 648 pp

External links
 

Siratus
Gastropods described in 1999